Giddings Independent School District is a public school district based in Giddings, Texas (USA).

In addition to Giddings, the district also serves rural areas in southern Lee County as well as very small portions of neighboring Fayette and Washington counties.

In 2009, the school district was rated "academically acceptable" by the Texas Education Agency.

Schools
Giddings High (Grades 9-12)
Giddings Middle (Grades 7-8)
Giddings Intermediate (Grades 4-6)
Giddings Elementary (Grades PK-3)

References

External links
Giddings ISD

School districts in Lee County, Texas
School districts in Fayette County, Texas
School districts in Washington County, Texas